The Thames A Class Rater is both a historic and modern specialist sailing craft designed for the particular conditions at Thames Sailing Club, on the River Thames at Surbiton in England. The class is a development of the Half Rater, which was designed by Linton Hope and Alfred Burgoyne in 1907. The rules refer to the craft as a yacht.

The rig is lofty, supported by standing rigging and usually by runners, and the hull is a scow with metal centreplate.

All boats built before 1922 are made from wood whilst those built since are of a different construction.

The rater is extremely fast, planes easily, and is a technically highly challenging boat to sail in anything above moderate wind conditions.  It is usually sailed with a crew of three.

Raters have traditionally commuted by river under tow between Thames Sailing Club at Surbiton and Upper Thames Sailing Club at Bourne End, Buckinghamshire.

Rater Development

Over the years raters have developed extraordinarily tall masts and high aspect mainsails to meet the local conditions, and catch the wind above the trees and other obstructions along the banks. Their sails were always large, but originally they had long booms and shorter masts, but over time the booms got shorter and the masts taller. At first they used the so-called balance lug rig, then the Gunter rig, before moving on to the current Bermuda rig. Over the years bamboo spars were replaced first by wood, then aluminium, and now mostly carbon fibre.

Where raters sail

 Thames Sailing Club
 Upper Thames Sailing Club
 Yangon Sailing Club
 Regattas

Mixed in with large fleets of other boats, the raters are usually seen at the following regattas with very tight, close quarters racing.

The Bourne End Week regatta at Upper Thames Sailing Club (seen as the Raters 'national' championships)

Handicap

Unusually, for a class designed about a rule allowing wide variation in most design parameters, individual boats are handicapped.

Handicaps will be determined by a handicap committee consisting of the Rater Captain, plus the fastest and slowest helms in the FRP and wooden fleets respectively, based on the results of the most recent Thames Championship. In the event that the Rater Captain is one of the latter four, the closest helm to the Rater Captain in their category shall also be co-opted to the committee.

This committee will meet two or three times a year to decide the handicap of all boats.

The overriding principle that the committee will work to is to encourage the older and slower boats to compete.

The Queens Cup
Presented by Queen Victoria in 1893 the race is set to be nine miles with a four-hour time limit. The race takes place on the final day of Bourne End week and is considered the most prestigious race that the raters compete in.

References 

Dinghies
Scows
Development sailing classes